The men's 200 metre backstroke at the 2007 World Aquatics Championships took place on 29 March (heats and semifinals) and 30 March (final) at Rod Laver Arena in Melbourne, Australia. 57 swimmers were entered in the event, of which 55 swam.

Existing records at the start of the event were:
World record (WR): 1:54.44, Aaron Peirsol (USA), August 19, 2006 in Victoria, Canada.
Championship record (CR): 1:54.66, Aaron Peirsol (USA), Montreal 2005 (July 29, 2005)

Results

Finals

Semifinals

Heats

See also
 Swimming at the 2005 World Aquatics Championships – Men's 200 metre backstroke
 Swimming at the 2008 Summer Olympics – Men's 200 metre backstroke
 Swimming at the 2009 World Aquatics Championships – Men's 200 metre backstroke

References

Men's 200m Back Preliminary results from the 2007 World Championships. Published by OmegaTiming.com (official timer of the '07 Worlds); retrieved 2009-07-11.
Men's 200m Back Semifinals results from the 2007 World Championships. Published by OmegaTiming.com (official timer of the '07 Worlds); retrieved 2009-07-11.
Men's 200m Back Final results from the 2007 World Championships. Published by OmegaTiming.com (official timer of the '07 Worlds); retrieved 2009-07-11.

Swimming at the 2007 World Aquatics Championships